Diamonds for Breakfast is the fourth studio album by French singer Amanda Lear, released in 1980 by the West German label Ariola Records. The album turned out a commercial success and spawned two European hit singles, "Fabulous (Lover, Love Me)" and "Diamonds".

Background 
The recording of the album commenced in 1979 in Munich, Germany. Again, Amanda wrote almost all the lyrics and worked with German producer and composer Anthony Monn. However, as a result of changing trends in the industry and Amanda's personal musical preferences, the album shifted from straightforward post-disco music towards pop rock, and Lear herself renounced her affiliation with the disco style and the "disco queen" image. The singer explained the title Diamonds for Breakfast in the liner notes, comparing diamonds to "every tear, every frustration, every heartache (...). Good and bad experiences, pleasure and pain". She went on to say she pities "people without feelings, they don't have diamonds for breakfast".

The album cover portrait of Lear, with Tiffany-designed diamond tears running down her cheek, is notable in the history of art and design as it was one of the first major assignments for French photographers Pierre et Gilles.

"Fabulous (Lover, Love Me)", released as the lead single in 1979, was a Top 10 hit in Sweden and a minor chart success in Germany. The second single, "Diamonds", was commercially successful as well, performing best in Norway, where it reached the Top 10. Three more singles were selected for different territories: "When" was released in Sweden, "Ho fatto l'amore con me" in Italy and France, and "Japan" was chosen for the Japanese market.

The Italian pressing of Diamonds for Breakfast included Italian language versions of "Insomnia" and "When", the former featuring guest vocals by Amanda's husband Alain-Philippe Malagnac d'Argens de Villèle. The album was met with a commercial success. It was Lear's breakthrough album in the Scandinavia, placing within the Top 10 in Sweden and Norway. However, it reported disappointing sales in Germany, her biggest market up to that point, charting outside the Top 40.

The rights to the Ariola-Eurodisc back catalogue are currently held by Sony BMG. Like most of Amanda's albums from the Ariola Records era, Diamonds for Breakfast has not received the official CD re-issue, excluding Russian bootleg re-releases.

Track listing

Standard edition 
Side A
 "Rockin' Rollin' (I Hear You Nagging)" (Anthony Monn, Amanda Lear) – 3:05  
 "I Need a Man" (Anthony Monn, Dieter Kawohl, Amanda Lear) – 3:40
 "It's a Better Life" (Anthony Monn, Amanda Lear) – 4:30 
 "Oh Boy" (Anthony Monn, Amanda Lear) – 4:30  
 "Insomnia" (Charly Ricanek, Amanda Lear) – 3:15

Side B
 "Diamonds" (Anthony Monn, Amanda Lear) – 4:55 
 "Japan" (Anthony Monn, Amanda Lear) – 3:15 
 "Fabulous (Lover, Love Me)" (Rainer Pietsch, Amanda Lear) – 5:25 
 "Ho fatto l'amore con me" (Cristiano Malgioglio) – 3:15 
 "When" (Rainer Pietsch, Anthony Monn, Amanda Lear) – 3:25

Italian edition 
Side A
 "Rockin' Rollin' (I Hear You Nagging)" (Anthony Monn, Amanda Lear) – 3:05
 "I Need a Man" (Anthony Monn, Dieter Kawohl, Amanda Lear) – 3:40
 "It's a Better Life" (Anthony Monn, Amanda Lear) – 4:30
 "Oh Boy" (Anthony Monn, Amanda Lear) – 4:30
 "Insomnia" (Charly Ricanek, Amanda Lear) – 3:15

Side B
 "Ciao" (Rainer Pietsch, Anthony Monn, Amanda Lear) – 3:25
 "Ho fatto l'amore con me" (Cristiano Malgioglio, Maria Antonietta Sisini, Giuni Russo) – 3:15
 "Diamonds" (Anthony Monn, Amanda Lear) – 4:55
 "Japan" (Anthony Monn, Amanda Lear) – 3:15
 "Fabulous (Lover, Love Me)" (Rainer Pietsch, Amanda Lear) – 5:25

Personnel 
 Amanda Lear – lead vocals
 Mats Björklund – bass guitar
 Frank (Bolzi) von dem Bottlenberg – engineer
 Lance Dixon – keyboards
 Dave Dowle – drums
 Wolly Emperhoff – backing vocals
 Jürgen Fritz – keyboards
 Martin Harrison – drums
 Les Hurdle – bass guitar
 Herbert Ihle – backing vocals
 Renate Mauer – backing vocals
 Anthony Monn – record producer, synthesizer, backing vocals
 Pierre et Gilles – artwork
 Rainer Pietsch – arranger, backing vocals
 Edith Prock – backing vocals
 Charly Ricanek – arranger, keyboards, synthesizer
 Claudia Schwarz – backing vocals
 Gary Unwin – bass guitar
 Gitta Walther – backing vocals

Chart performance

Release history

References

External links 
 Diamonds for Breakfast at Discogs
 Diamonds for Breakfast at Rate Your Music

1980 albums
Amanda Lear albums